Blairo Borges Maggi (born 29 May 1956) is a  Brazilian billionaire businessman, and former governor of the state of Mato Grosso.

Maggi owns the Amaggi Group, a large company that harvests, processes, and exports soybeans, and owns soy terminals, highways, and waterways.

Early life
Blairo Borges Maggi was born in São Miguel do Iguaçu, Paraná, Brazil, the son of Andre Maggi, founder of the Amaggi Group. He graduated from Federal University of Paraná, majoring in agronomy.

Career
Maggi is the world's largest soybean producer. His accusers hold him responsible for the destruction of the Amazon rainforest. His defenders say he is taking Brazil forward. In this respect he is unapologetic, telling The New York Times in 2003:
"To me, a 40 percent increase in deforestation doesn't mean anything at all, and I don't feel the slightest guilt over what we are doing here [...] We're talking about an area larger than Europe that has barely been touched, so there is nothing at all to get worried about".

Maggi received the Golden Chainsaw Award in 2006 from Greenpeace for being the Brazilian who most contributed to the destruction of the Amazon Rainforest.

In 2015, Maggi's net worth was estimated by Forbes at US$1.2 billion, based on his 16% stake in Grupo Andre Maggi.

Paradise Papers 

In November 2017 an investigation conducted by the International Consortium of Investigative Journalism cited his name in the list of politicians named in "Paradise Papers" allegations.

References

|-

Brazilian businesspeople
Governors of Mato Grosso
1956 births
Living people
Brazilian farmers
People from Paraná (state)
Members of the Federal Senate (Brazil)
Cidadania politicians
Liberal Party (Brazil, 2006) politicians
Progressistas politicians
Brazilian people of Italian descent
Brazilian billionaires
People named in the Paradise Papers
Agriculture ministers of Brazil